René Chassot (18 January 1891 – 18 June 1922) was a French racing cyclist. He rode in the 1919 Tour de France.

References

1891 births
1922 deaths
French male cyclists
Place of birth missing